Michael Daley is an Australian politician

Michael Daley may also refer to:

Michael Daley (boxer) (1865–1910), American boxer
Michael P. Daley, American author and cultural historian
Michael Daley, director of ArtWatch UK, the UK branch of ArtWatch International
Michael Daley Award

See also
Michael Daly (disambiguation)